Chatto may refer to:

 Chatto (surname)
 Chatto & Windus, a UK book publisher based in London
 Pickering & Chatto Publishers, based in London
 Beth Chatto Gardens, in Essex, UK

See also
 Chato (disambiguation)
 Catto (disambiguation)
 Chatton (disambiguation)